The five-paragraph essay is a format of essay having five paragraphs: one introductory paragraph, three body paragraphs with support and development, and one concluding paragraph. Because of this structure, it is also known as a hamburger  essay, one three one, or a three-tier essay.

Overview 
The five-paragraph essay is a form of essay having five paragraphs:
 one introductory paragraph,
 three body paragraphs with support and development, and
 one concluding paragraph.

The introduction serves to inform the reader of the basic premises, and then to state the author's thesis, or central idea. A thesis can also be used to point out the subject of each body paragraph. When a thesis essay is applied to this format, the first paragraph typically consists of a narrative hook, followed by a sentence that introduces the general theme, then another sentence narrowing the focus of the one previous. (If the author is using this format for a text-based thesis, then a sentence quoting the text, supporting the essay-writer's claim, would typically go here, along with the name of the text and the name of the author. Example: "In the book Night, Elie Wiesel says..."). After this, the author narrows the discussion of the topic by stating or identifying a problem. Often, an organizational sentence is used here to describe the layout of the paper. Finally, the last sentence of the first paragraph of such an essay would state the thesis the author is trying to prove. The thesis is often linked to a "road map" for the essay, which is basically an embedded outline stating precisely what the three body paragraphs will address and giving the items in the order of the presentation. Not to be confused with an organizational sentence, a thesis merely states "The book Night follows Elie Wiesel's journey from innocence to experience," while an organizational sentence directly states the structure and order of the essay. Basically, the thesis statement should be proven throughout the essay. In each of the three body paragraphs, one or more identified (evidence/fact/etc.) that supports the thesis statement is discussed. And in the conclusion, everything is analyzed and summed up. For example, the conclusion part in an essay about sports: "Sports can bring a bunch of benefits for youth, including general health, together with blood circulation and overall physical stamina improvement. Sport develops and improves people’s physical, social, and organizational skills, which are beneficial in personal and professional life and must always be obtained."

Critique 
According to Thomas E. Nunnally and Kimberly Wesley, most teachers and professors consider the five-paragraph form ultimately restricting for fully developing an idea. Wesley argues that the form is never appropriate. Nunnally states that the form can be good for developing analytical skills that should then be expanded. Similarly, American educator David F. Labaree claims that "The Rule of Five" is "dysfunctional... off-putting, infantilising and intellectually arid" because demands for the essay's form often obscure its meaning and, therefore, largely automatize creating and reading five-paragraph essays.

See also 
 De Inventione
 Eight-legged essay
 Rhetorica ad Herennium (c. 90 BC)
 Schaffer paragraph
 IMRAD
 IRAC
 Multigenre research paper
 Explication de Texte

Notes

References 
 Corbett, Edward P.J.  Classical Rhetoric for the Modern Student.  4th ed.  Oxford UP, 1999.
 Hodges, John C. et al.  Harbrace Handbook.  14th ed.

Writing